Çanaqbulaq (also, Chanakhbulak) is a village and municipality in the Yardymli Rayon of Azerbaijan.  It has a population of 599.

References 

Populated places in Yardimli District